Melanie Moore Paxson (née Moore; born September 26, 1972) is an American actress. She is known for her roles as Jaclyn in Cupid, Sara Brennan in Happy Family and as Julie in Notes from the Underbelly. Paxson also appeared in a number of Gladware television commercials in the early 2000s.

Life and career
Paxson was born in Champaign, Illinois, and grew up in Mahomet, Illinois. She graduated from the University of Missouri with a bachelor's degree in Theatre. She received training in acting at Second City Chicago and performed with the Steppenwolf Theatre Company.

Paxson later became involved with "The Crew on the U" on Chicago's WCIU-TV. The Crew was made up of a group of young actors (including WCIU personality George Blaise) that appeared in promos for the station shortly after WCIU became a full-time general English language station after Univision (its former affiliate) bought WGBO-TV. Paxson also appeared as Velma in promos for WCIU's Scooby-Doo episodes the station aired on weekday mornings. Paxson was still seen on WCIU and WFBT (The Chicago low power station that was first home to MeTV in 2003) in disclaimers for E/I Children's programming as late as the mid 2000s. Paxson by that time had become relatively famous on a national level.

She pursued a screen career. In 1997, she had an uncredited role in the series Early Edition. Her first notable screen role was a recurring role as Jaclyn in the ABC series Cupid from 1998 to 1999. She went on guest star in the series The Drew Carey Show, Quintuplets, Joey, Related, Kitchen Confidential, CSI: Crime Scene Investigation, Surviving Suburbia, Rules of Engagement, Medium and The Exes. From 2003 to 2004, Paxson had a regular role in the NBC sitcom Happy Family as Sara Brennan. From 2007 to 2008, she co-starred as Julie in the ABC sitcom Notes from the Underbelly, the series aired for two seasons. From 2009 to 2010, she had a recurring role as Doris Madigan (née Aidem) on the Nickelodeon sitcom True Jackson, VP. She is also the spokeswoman in Red Robin's burger commercials.

Paxson's film credits include Ready to Rumble (2000), Slackers (2002), Saving Mr. Banks as Dolly (Dolores Vought), Disney's secretary (2013), and starring as Joyce DeWitt in the television film Behind the Camera: The Unauthorized Story of Three's Company (2003). She has appeared in television commercials for Fiber One, Target, Yoplait, Red Robin, Glad Trash Bags, Hotels.com and Serta mattresses. From 2015 to 2019 she starred in the Disney Channel Original Movie franchise Descendants with its sequels, Descendants 2 and  Descendants 3. She played the Fairy Godmother from Cinderella now serving as the Headmistress for the school, Auradon Prep. She also played a mother of a schoolchild in a second season episode of the ABC comedy Speechless, which played on October 4, 2017.

Personal life
Paxson is married to Andy Paxson, co-owner of Los Angeles restaurants Sushi Note and Melanie Wine Bar. They have a son Miller and daughter Winifred.

Filmography

Film

Television

References

External links

1972 births
Actresses from Illinois
American film actresses
American stage actresses
American television actresses
Living people
People from Champaign, Illinois
University of Missouri alumni
20th-century American actresses
21st-century American actresses